Charlene Maria Attard (born 31 January 1987 in Pietà) is a track and field sprint athlete who competes internationally for Malta.

Attard represented Malta at the 2008 Summer Olympics in Beijing. She competed at the 100 metres sprint and placed sixth in her heat without advancing to the second round. She ran the distance in a time of 12.20 seconds.

References

External links
 

1987 births
Living people
Maltese female sprinters
Olympic athletes of Malta
Athletes (track and field) at the 2008 Summer Olympics
World Athletics Championships athletes for Malta
People from Pietà, Malta
European Games competitors for Malta
Athletes (track and field) at the 2015 European Games
Olympic female sprinters